Sunith Thakur (born 10 September 1970) is a former Indian female judoka. She represented India at the 1996 Summer Olympics, where she competed in the Women's half lightweight event. Thakur also won a bronze medal in the 1995 Asian Judo Championships

She was married to a fellow Indian judoka, Narender Singh who has also represented India in both 1992 Summer Olympics and in the 1996 Summer Olympics.

References 

1970 births
Living people
Indian female judoka
Olympic judoka of India
Judoka at the 1996 Summer Olympics
Place of birth missing (living people)
Judoka at the 1994 Asian Games
Asian Games competitors for India